Aeacides may also refer to Peleus, son of Aeacus, or Achilles, grandson of Aeacus.

Aeacides (died 313 BC), king of Epirus (331–316, 313), was a son of king Arybbas and grandson of king Alcetas I.

Family 
Aeacides married Phthia, the daughter of Menon of Pharsalus, by whom he had the celebrated son Pyrrhus and two daughters, Deidamia and Troias.

Reign 
In 331 BC, on the death of his cousin king Alexander, who was slain in Italy, Aeacides succeeded to the throne of Epirus. In 317 BC he assisted Polyperchon in restoring his cousin Olympias and the five-year-old king Alexander IV to Macedonia. The following year he had to march to the assistance of Olympias, who was hard pressed by Cassander; but the Epirots disliked the military service, rose against Aeacides, and drove him from the kingdom. Pyrrhus, who was then only two years old, was saved by some faithful servants. Becoming tired of the Macedonian rule, the Epirots recalled Aeacides in 313 BC; Cassander immediately sent an army against him under his brother, Philip, who defeated him in two battles. During the last of battle Aeacides was killed.

Notes and References

Sources

External links
The Ancient Library - Aeacides

4th-century BC births
313 BC deaths
Rulers of Ancient Epirus
4th-century BC Greek people
4th-century BC rulers
Pyrrhus of Epirus